We Were Here (2006) is the first full-length album by American singer-songwriter Joshua Radin. It reached #34 on the Top Heatseekers Chart.  The singer-songwriter released a cover of the song "Only You" as a bonus song.

Usage in media
The songs "Closer" and "Winter" are featured in the episodes "My Best Laid Plans" and "My Screw Up", respectively, in the American television program Scrubs.

"Winter" also features in the web series Jake and Amir episode "Amir's Birthday", and season 2 episode "Fiona, Interrupted" of Shameless.

"What if You" was in Catch and Release, starring Jennifer Garner and Timothy Olyphant.

Videos
Radin's first music video for the song "Closer" was directed by Zach Braff.

Track listing

Personnel
Joshua Radin – vocals, guitar
Chris Holmes – guitar, bass, keyboards, tambora, producer, programming
Priscilla Ahn – piano, vocals
Chad Fischer – piano
Jason Kanakis – guitar
Solomon Snyder – bass
Colette Alexander – cello
John Krovoza – cello
Oliver Kraus – cello

References

2006 debut albums
Joshua Radin albums